Katerina Stewart (born July 17, 1997) is an American tennis player.

Stewart has won 13 singles and five doubles titles on the ITF Women's Circuit. On July 27, 2015, she reached her best singles ranking of world No. 158. On July 30, 2018, she peaked at No. 400 in the doubles rankings.

She made her WTA Tour debut at the 2014 US Open, having been handed a wildcard into the doubles tournament alongside Louisa Chirico.

She enrolled at the West Point Preparatory School, starting the program in July 2016.

Personal life
She is of Argentine-Italian descent through her mother, Marina. Her Romanian-born father, Caesar, is the director of Next Level Tennis Academy in Coral Gables, Florida.

ITF Circuit finals

Singles: 18 (13 titles, 5 runner–ups)

Doubles: 10 (5 titles, 5 runner–ups)

Junior Grand Slam finals

Doubles

References

External links
 
 

1997 births
Living people
American female tennis players
American people of Argentine descent
American people of Italian descent
American people of Romanian descent
Tennis players from Miami
21st-century American women